José Carlos Pace (October 6, 1944 – March 18, 1977)  was a racing driver from Brazil.  He participated in 73 Formula One World Championship Grands Prix, debuting at the 1972 South African Grand Prix.  He won one race, achieved six podiums, and scored a total of 58 championship points.  He also secured one pole position.

Career

Pace was a contemporary of the Fittipaldi brothers, Wilson and Emerson, and began racing in Brazil in the late 1960s. He travelled to Europe in 1970 and competed in British Formula 3, winning the Forward Trust championship in a Lotus car. In  he moved up to Formula Two with Frank Williams, but did not score any points from six races. He scored points on two occasions and finished eighteenth in the Drivers' Championship. His best result came at the non-championship Victory Race, in which he finished in second position. He also competed in some further F2 and Can-Am races.

For , Pace moved to the Surtees team and improved to eleventh place in the championship after scoring a fourth place in Germany and his first championship podium finish with third in Austria.  He also set the fastest lap in both of these events. He also competed in three F2 races for Surtees, but his main racing activities outside F1 were in the World Sportscar Championship, in which he drove for the works Ferrari team. Sharing a 312PB with Arturo Merzario, the duo finished second at the Nürburgring and at Le Mans (after starting in pole position for the latter event), and third at Watkins Glen.

He drove a privately entered Brabham for Goldie Hexagon Racing at the French Grand Prix but failed to qualify, before moving to the works team alongside namesake Carlos Reutemann for the next race. After initially struggling with the new machinery, he finished fifth and set the fastest lap at Monza, and repeated the feat on his way to second, behind Reutemann, at Watkins Glen, securing a one-two finish for Brabham.

The Brabham team's BT44B chassis were competitive throughout the  season, allowing Pace and Reutemann to feature at the front of the grid. Pace duly took his first and only Formula One victory in front of his home crowd at the Brazilian Grand Prix, took his first pole position at the following race in South Africa, and also finished on the podium at Monaco and Silverstone, ending the season sixth overall in the Drivers' Championship and helping Brabham to second in the Constructors' Championship, behind Ferrari.

The Italian flat 12 units were larger, heavier, less reliable and less economical than their V8 predecessors, restricting Pace to fourteenth place in the championship, whilst Reutemann left the team before the end of the season.

By the start of the  season, the competitiveness and durability of the Alfa engines had been much improved for Pace and his new teammate, John Watson. He demonstrated this fact by taking second position at the season opener in Argentina, and running strongly in the next two Grands Prix before suffering from mechanical trouble, but he was unable to capitalise on the improved performance for the rest of the season due to his sudden death.

Death and honours
Pace was killed in a private light aircraft accident near São Paulo, Brazil on 18 March 1977, 13 days after fellow F1 driver Tom Pryce and marshal Jansen Van Vuuren lost their lives during the 1977 South African Grand Prix. The Interlagos track, the scene of his only F1 win in 1975, was renamed Autódromo José Carlos Pace in his honour. Pace is buried in Cemitério do Araçá, São Paulo.

In the 1977 motorsport film Bobby Deerfield, the eponymous title character is represented by Pace in the racing scenes.

Racing record

Career summary

Complete Formula One World Championship results
(key) (Races in bold indicate pole position / Races in italics indicate fastest lap)

Complete Formula One Non-Championship results
(key) (Races in bold indicate pole position / Races in italics indicate fastest lap)

Complete 24 Hours of Le Mans results

References

Books

External links

Pace's profile at Motorsportmemorial.org

1944 births
1977 deaths
Brazilian racing drivers
Brazilian Formula One drivers
Formula One race winners
European Formula Two Championship drivers
British Formula Three Championship drivers
Racing drivers from São Paulo
Brazilian people of Italian descent
Victims of aviation accidents or incidents in Brazil
Victims of aviation accidents or incidents in 1977
24 Hours of Le Mans drivers
Williams Formula One drivers
Surtees Formula One drivers
Goldie Hexagon Racing Formula One drivers
Brabham Formula One drivers
World Sportscar Championship drivers